Martuni is a village in the Chambarak Municipality of the Gegharkunik Province of Armenia.

Etymology 
The village is named in honor of Alexander Miasnikian, the first Soviet premier of Armenia, whose nom de guerre was "Martuni".

History 
There are medieval forts and the 10th-century castle of Aghjaghala nearby. The first inhabitants of the community were survivors of the Armenian genocide (Mets Yeghern), mostly from Van, Alashkert, Kars and Sasun.

Development program 
In 2014, a three-year development program was initiated in Martuni, with different organizations working with developing infrastructure, education, and health in the village. Martuni was chosen for the project as it was first settled by survivors of the Armenian genocide in 1915, and the project was part of the commemoration of the centennial of the genocide.

References

External links 
 
 

Populated places in Gegharkunik Province